1928 in Argentine football saw the Primera División league expanded to include 36 teams. They played in a single league with each team playing the other only once.

Huracán won its 4th. title in Primera.

Primera División
El Porvenir and Argentino de Banfield returned to the top division after their runs on Primera B while Liberal Argentino and Porteño were relegated.

Lower Divisions

Primera B
Champion: Colegiales

Primera C
Champion: Acassuso

Argentina national team
The national team played the football tournament where finished 2nd. to Uruguay. Therefore Argentina was awarded the silver medal.

Argentina would later defeat Uruguay twice, winning the Copa Newton by 1-0 in Avellaneda and then the Copa Lipton after a 2-2 in Montevideo, where Argentina won the trophy as visiting team, according to tournament rules.

1928 Summer Olympics

Finals

Copa Newton

Copa Lipton

References

 
Seasons in Argentine football
, Argentine
1928 in South American football